In computer programming, foreach loop (or for-each loop) is a control flow statement for traversing items in a collection.  is usually used in place of a standard  loop statement. Unlike other  loop constructs, however,  loops usually maintain no explicit counter: they essentially say "do this to everything in this set", rather than "do this  times". This avoids potential off-by-one errors and makes code simpler to read. In object-oriented languages, an iterator, even if implicit, is often used as the means of traversal.

The  statement in some languages has some defined order, processing each item in the collection from the first to the last.
The  statement in many other languages, especially array programming languages, does not have any particular order. This simplifies loop optimization in general and in particular allows vector processing of items in the collection concurrently.

Syntax 
Syntax varies among languages. Most use the simple word for, roughly as follows:

 for each item in collection:
   do something to item

Language support 

Programming languages which support foreach loops include ABC, ActionScript, Ada, C++11, C#, ColdFusion Markup Language (CFML), Cobra, D, Daplex (query language), Delphi, ECMAScript, Erlang, Java (since 1.5), JavaScript, Lua, Objective-C (since 2.0), ParaSail, Perl, PHP, Prolog, Python, R, REALbasic, Rebol, Red, Ruby, Scala, Smalltalk, Swift, Tcl, tcsh, Unix shells, Visual Basic .NET, and Windows PowerShell. Notable languages without foreach are C, and C++ pre-C++11.

ActionScript 3.0 

ActionScript supports the ECMAScript 4.0 Standard for for each .. in which pulls the value at each index.

var foo:Object = {
	"apple":1,
	"orange":2
};

for each (var value:int in foo) { 
	trace(value); 
}

// returns "1" then "2"

It also supports for .. in which pulls the key at each index.

for (var key:String in foo) { 
	trace(key); 
}

// returns "apple" then "orange"

Ada 

Ada supports foreach loops as part of the normal for loop. Say X is an array:

for I in X'Range loop
   X (I) := Get_Next_Element;
end loop;

This syntax is used on mostly arrays, but will also work with other types when a full iteration is needed.

Ada 2012 has generalized loops to foreach loops on any kind of container (array, lists, maps...):

for Obj of X loop
   -- Work on Obj
end loop;

C 
The C language does not have collections or a foreach construct. However, it has several standard data structures that can be used as collections, and foreach can be made easily with a macro.

However, two obvious problems occur:
 The macro is unhygienic: it declares a new variable in the existing scope which remains after the loop.
 One foreach macro cannot be defined that works with different collection types (e.g., array and linked list) or that is extensible to user types.

C string as a collection of char
#include <stdio.h>

/* foreach macro viewing a string as a collection of char values */
#define foreach(ptrvar, strvar) \
char* ptrvar; \
for (ptrvar = strvar; (*ptrvar) != '\0'; *ptrvar++)

int main(int argc, char** argv) {
 char* s1 = "abcdefg";
 char* s2 = "123456789";
 foreach (p1, s1) {
  printf("loop 1: %c\n", *p1);
 }
 foreach (p2, s2) {
  printf("loop 2: %c\n", *p2);
 }
 return 0;
}

C int array as a collection of int (array size known at compile-time)
#include <stdio.h>

/* foreach macro viewing an array of int values as a collection of int values */
#define foreach(intpvar, intarr) \
int* intpvar; \
for (intpvar = intarr; intpvar < (intarr + (sizeof(intarr)/sizeof(intarr[0]))); ++intpvar)

int main(int argc, char** argv) {
 int a1[] = {1, 1, 2, 3, 5, 8};
 int a2[] = {3, 1, 4, 1, 5, 9};
 foreach (p1, a1) {
  printf("loop 1: %d\n", *p1);
 }
 foreach (p2, a2) {
  printf("loop 2: %d\n", *p2);
 }
 return 0;
}

Most general: string or array as collection (collection size known at run-time)
 Note:  can be removed and typeof(col[0]) used in its place with GCC
#include <stdio.h>
#include <string.h>

/* foreach macro viewing an array of given type as a collection of values of given type */
#define arraylen(arr) (sizeof(arr)/sizeof(arr[0]))
#define foreach(idxtype, idxpvar, col, colsiz) \
idxtype* idxpvar; \
for (idxpvar = col; idxpvar < (col + colsiz); ++idxpvar)

int main(int argc, char** argv) {
 char* c1 = "collection";
 int c2[] = {3, 1, 4, 1, 5, 9};
 double* c3;
 int c3len = 4;
 c3 = (double*)calloc(c3len, sizeof(double)); 
 c3[0] = 1.2; c3[1] = 3.4; c3[2] = 5.6; c3[3] = 7.8;

 foreach (char, p1, c1, strlen(c1)) {
  printf("loop 1: %c\n", *p1);
 }
 foreach (int, p2, c2, arraylen(c2)) {
  printf("loop 2: %d\n", *p2);
 }
 foreach (double, p3, c3, c3len) {
  printf("loop 3: %.1lf\n", *p3);
 }
 return 0;
}

C# 
In C#, assuming that myArray is an array of integers:

foreach (int x in myArray) { Console.WriteLine(x); }

Language Integrated Query (LINQ) provides the following syntax, accepting a delegate or lambda expression:

myArray.ToList().ForEach(x => Console.WriteLine(x));

C++ 

C++11 provides a foreach loop. The syntax is similar to that of Java:

#include <iostream>

int main()
{
  int myint[] = {1, 2, 3, 4, 5};

  for (int i : myint)
  {
    std::cout << i << '\n';
  }
}

C++11 range-based for statements have been implemented in GNU Compiler Collection (GCC) (since version 4.6), Clang (since version 3.0) and Visual C++ 2012 (version 11 )

The range-based for is syntactic sugar equivalent to:

  for (auto __anon = begin(myint); __anon != end(myint); ++__anon)
  {
    auto i = *__anon;
    std::cout << i << '\n';
  }

The compiler uses argument-dependent lookup to resolve the begin and end functions.

The C++ Standard Library also supports for_each, that applies each element to a function, which can be any predefined function or a lambda expression. While range-based for is only from the beginning to the end, the range and direction you can change the direction or range by altering the first two parameters.

#include <iostream>
#include <algorithm> // contains std::for_each
#include <vector>

int main()
{
  std::vector<int> v {1, 2, 3, 4, 5};

  std::for_each(v.begin(), v.end(), [](int i)
  {
    std::cout << i << '\n';
  });

  std::cout << "reversed but skip 2 elements:\n";

  std::for_each(v.rbegin()+2, v.rend(), [](int i)
  {
    std::cout << i << '\n';
  });
}

Qt, a C++ framework, offers a macro providing foreach loops using the STL iterator interface:

#include <QList>
#include <QDebug>

int main()
{
  QList<int> list;

  list << 1 << 2 << 3 << 4 << 5;

  foreach (int i, list)
  {
    qDebug() << i;
  }
}

Boost, a set of free peer-reviewed portable C++ libraries also provides foreach loops:

#include <boost/foreach.hpp>
#include <iostream>
 
int main()
{
  int myint[] = {1, 2, 3, 4, 5};
 
  BOOST_FOREACH(int &i, myint)
  {
    std::cout << i << '\n';
  }
}

C++/CLI 

The C++/CLI language proposes a construct similar to C#.

Assuming that myArray is an array of integers:

for each (int x in myArray)
{
    Console::WriteLine(x);
}

ColdFusion Markup Language (CFML)

Script syntax 

// arrays
arrayeach([1,2,3,4,5], function(v){
    writeOutput(v);
});

// or

for (v in [1,2,3,4,5]){
    writeOutput(v);
}

// or

// (Railo only; not supported in ColdFusion)
letters = ["a","b","c","d","e"];
letters.each(function(v){
    writeOutput(v); // abcde
});

// structs
for (k in collection){
    writeOutput(collection[k]);
}

// or

structEach(collection, function(k,v){
    writeOutput("key: #k#, value: #v#;");
});

// or
// (Railo only; not supported in ColdFusion)
collection.each(function(k,v){
    writeOutput("key: #k#, value: #v#;");
});

Tag syntax 

<!--- arrays --->
<cfloop index="v" array="#['a','b','c','d','e']#">
  <cfoutput>#v#</cfoutput><!--- a b c d e  --->
</cfloop>
CFML incorrectly identifies the value as "index" in this construct; the index variable does receive the actual value of the array element, not its index.

<!--- structs --->
<cfloop item="k" collection="#collection#">
    <cfoutput>#collection[k]#</cfoutput>
</cfloop>

Common Lisp 

Common Lisp provides foreach ability either with the dolist macro:
(dolist (i '(1 3 5 6 8 10 14 17))
  (print i))
or the powerful loop macro to iterate on more data types
(loop for i in '(1 3 5 6 8 10 14 17)
      do (print i))

and even with the mapcar function:
(mapcar #'print '(1 3 5 6 8 10 14 17))

D 

foreach(item; set) {
  // do something to item
}

or

foreach(argument) {
  // pass value
}

Dart 

for (final element in someCollection) {
  // do something with element
}

Object Pascal, Delphi 

Foreach support was added in Delphi 2005, and uses an enumerator variable that must be declared in the var section.

for enumerator in collection do
begin
  //do something here
end;

Eiffel 

The iteration (foreach) form of the Eiffel loop construct is introduced by the keyword across.

In this example, every element of the structure my_list is printed:

            across my_list as ic loop print (ic.item) end

The local entity ic is an instance of the library class ITERATION_CURSOR. The cursor's feature item provides access to each structure element. Descendants of class ITERATION_CURSOR can be created to handle specialized iteration algorithms. The types of objects that can be iterated across (my_list in the example) are based on classes that inherit from the library class ITERABLE.

The iteration form of the Eiffel loop can also be used as a boolean expression when the keyword loop is replaced by either all (effecting universal quantification) or some (effecting existential quantification).

This iteration is a boolean expression which is true if all items in my_list have counts greater than three:

            across my_list as ic all ic.item.count > 3 end

The following is true if at least one item has a count greater than three:

            across my_list as ic some ic.item.count > 3 end

Go 

Go's foreach loop can be used to loop over an array, slice, string, map, or channel.

Using the two-value form, we get the index/key (first element) and the value (second element):
for index, value := range someCollection {
	// Do something to index and value
}

Using the one-value form, we get the index/key (first element):
for index := range someCollection {
	// Do something to index
}

Groovy 

Groovy supports for loops over collections like arrays, lists and ranges:

def x = [1,2,3,4]
for (v in x)           // loop over the 4-element array x
{
    println v
}

for (v in [1,2,3,4])   // loop over 4-element literal list 
{
    println v
}

for (v in 1..4)        // loop over the range 1..4
{
    println v
}

Groovy also supports a C-style for loop with an array index:

for (i = 0; i < x.size(); i++)
{
    println x[i]
}

Collections in Groovy can also be iterated over using the each keyword
and a closure.  By default, the loop dummy is named it

x.each{ println it }     // print every element of the x array
x.each{i-> println i}    // equivalent to line above, only loop dummy explicitly named "i"

Haskell 

Haskell allows looping over lists with monadic actions using mapM_ and forM_ (mapM_ with its arguments flipped) from Control.Monad:

It's also possible to generalize those functions to work on applicative functors rather than monads and any data structure that is traversable using traverse (for with its arguments flipped) and mapM (forM with its arguments flipped) from Data.Traversable.

Haxe 

for (value in iterable) {
    trace(value);
}

Lambda.iter(iterable, function(value) trace(value));

Java 

In Java, a foreach-construct was introduced in Java Development Kit (JDK) 1.5.0.

Official sources use several names for the construct. It is referred to as the "Enhanced for Loop", the "For-Each Loop", and the "foreach statement".

for (Type item : iterableCollection) {
    // Do something to item
}

Java also provides the stream api since java 8:
   List<Integer> intList = List.of(1, 2, 3, 4);
   intList.stream().forEach(i -> System.out.println(i));

JavaScript 
The ECMAScript 6 standard has for..of for index-less iteration over generators, arrays and more:
for (var item of array){
    // Do stuff
}

Alternatively, function-based style: 

array.forEach(item => {
    // Do stuff
})

For unordered iteration over the keys in an Object, JavaScript features the for...in loop:

for (var key in object) {
    // Do stuff with object[key]
}

To limit the iteration to the object's own properties, excluding those inherited through the prototype chain, it is sometimes useful to add a hasOwnProperty() test, if supported by the JavaScript engine (for WebKit/Safari, this means "in version 3 or later").

for (var key in object) {
    if (object.hasOwnProperty(key)) {
        // Do stuff with object[key]
    }
}

ECMAScript 5 provided Object.keys method, to transfer the own keys of an object into array.
var book = { name: "A Christmas Carol", author: "Charles Dickens" }; 
for(var key of Object.keys(book)){
    alert("PropertyName = " key + " Property Value = " + book[key]);
}

Lua 

Iterate only through numerical index values:for index, value in ipairs(array) do
	-- do something
endIterate through all index values:for index, value in pairs(array) do
	-- do something
end

Mathematica 

In Mathematica, Do will simply evaluate an expression for each element of a list, without returning any value.

In[]:= Do[doSomethingWithItem, {item, list}]

It is more common to use Table, which returns the result of each evaluation in a new list.

In[]:= list = {3, 4, 5};

In[]:= Table[item^2, {item, list}]
Out[]= {9, 16, 25}

MATLAB 

for item = array
%do something
end

Mint 

For each loops are supported in Mint, possessing the following syntax:
for each element of list
    /* 'Do something.' */
end

The for (;;) or while (true) infinite loop
in Mint can be written using a for each loop and an infinitely long list.

import type
/* 'This function is mapped to'
 * 'each index number i of the'
 * 'infinitely long list.'
 */
sub identity(x)
    return x
end
/* 'The following creates the list'
 * '[0, 1, 2, 3, 4, 5, ..., infinity]'
 */
infiniteList = list(identity)
for each element of infiniteList
    /* 'Do something forever.' */
end

Objective-C 

Foreach loops, called Fast enumeration, are supported starting in Objective-C 2.0. They can be used to iterate over any object that implements the NSFastEnumeration protocol, including NSArray, NSDictionary (iterates over keys), NSSet, etc.

NSArray *a = [NSArray new];       // Any container class can be substituted

for(id obj in a) {                // Note the dynamic typing (we do not need to know the
                                  // Type of object stored in 'a'.  In fact, there can be
                                  // many different types of object in the array.

    printf("%s\n", [[obj description] UTF8String]);  // Must use UTF8String with %s
    NSLog(@"%@", obj);                               // Leave as an object
}

NSArrays can also broadcast a message to their members:

NSArray *a = [NSArray new];

[a makeObjectsPerformSelector:@selector(printDescription)];

Where blocks are available, an NSArray can automatically perform a block on every contained item:

[myArray enumerateObjectsUsingBlock:^(id obj, NSUInteger idx, BOOL *stop)
	{
		NSLog(@"obj %@", obj);
		if ([obj shouldStopIterationNow])
			*stop = YES;
	}];

The type of collection being iterated will dictate the item returned with each iteration.
For example:

NSDictionary *d = [NSDictionary new];

for(id key in d) {
    NSObject *obj = [d objectForKey:key];      // We use the (unique) key to access the (possibly nonunique) object.
    NSLog(@"%@", obj);
}

OCaml 

OCaml is a functional language. Thus, the equivalent of a foreach loop can be achieved as a library function over lists and arrays.

For lists:

List.iter (fun x -> print_int x) [1;2;3;4];; 

or in short way:

List.iter print_int [1;2;3;4];; 

For arrays:

Array.iter (fun x -> print_int x) [|1;2;3;4|];;

or in short way:

Array.iter print_int [|1;2;3;4|];;

ParaSail 

The ParaSail parallel programming language supports several kinds of iterators, including a general "for each" iterator over a container:

var Con : Container<Element_Type> := ...
// ...
for each Elem of Con concurrent loop  // loop may also be "forward" or "reverse" or unordered (the default)
  // ... do something with Elem
end loop

ParaSail also supports filters on iterators, and the ability to refer to both the key and the value of a map. Here is a forward iteration over the elements of "My_Map" selecting only elements where the keys are in "My_Set":
var My_Map : Map<Key_Type => Univ_String, Value_Type => Tree<Integer>> := ...
const My_Set : Set<Univ_String> := ["abc", "def", "ghi"];

for each [Str => Tr] of My_Map {Str in My_Set} forward loop
   // ... do something with Str or Tr
end loop

Pascal 

In Pascal, ISO standard 10206:1990 introduced iteration over set types, thus:

var
  elt: ElementType;
  eltset: set of ElementType;

{...}

for elt in eltset do
  { ... do something with elt }

Perl 

In Perl, foreach (which is equivalent to the shorter for) can be used to traverse elements of a list.  The expression which denotes the collection to loop over is evaluated in list-context and each item of the resulting list is, in turn, aliased to the loop variable.

List literal example:

foreach (1, 2, 3, 4) {
    print $_;
}

Array examples:

foreach (@arr) {
    print $_;
}

foreach $x (@arr) { #$x is the element in @arr
    print $x;
} 

Hash example:

foreach $x (keys %hash) {
    print $x . " = " . $hash{$x}; # $x is a key in %hash and $hash{$x} is its value
}

Direct modification of collection members:

@arr = ( 'remove-foo', 'remove-bar' );
foreach $x (@arr){
    $x =~ s/remove-//;
}
# Now @arr = ('foo', 'bar');

PHP 

foreach ($set as $value) {
    // Do something to $value;
}

It is also possible to extract both keys and values using the alternate syntax:

foreach ($set as $key => $value) {
    echo "{$key} has a value of {$value}";
}

Direct modification of collection members:

$arr = array(1, 2, 3);
foreach ($arr as &$value) { // Note the &, $value is a reference to the original value inside $arr
    $value++;
}
// Now $arr = array(2, 3, 4);

// also works with the full syntax
foreach ($arr as $key => &$value) {
    $value++;
}
 More information

Python 

for item in iterable_collection:
    # Do something with item

Python's tuple assignment, fully available in its foreach loop, also makes it trivial to iterate on (key, value) pairs in associative arrays:

for key, value in some_dict.items():  # Direct iteration on a dict iterates on its keys
    # Do stuff

As for ... in is the only kind of for loop in Python, the equivalent to the "counter" loop found in other languages is...

for i in range(len(seq)):
    # Do something to seq[i]

... though using the enumerate function is considered more "Pythonic":

for i, item in enumerate(seq):
    # Do stuff with item
    # Possibly assign it back to seq[i]

R 

for (item in object) {
    # Do something with item
}

As for ... in is the only kind of for loop in R, the equivalent to the "counter" loop found in other languages is...

for (i in seq_along(object)) {
    # Do something with object[[i]]
}

Racket 

(for ([item set])
  (do-something-with item))

or using the conventional Scheme for-each function:

(for-each do-something-with a-list)
do-something-with is a one-argument function.

Raku 

In Raku, a sister language to Perl, for must be used to traverse elements of a list (foreach is not allowed). The expression which denotes the collection to loop over is evaluated in list-context, but not flattened by default, and each item of the resulting list is, in turn, aliased to the loop variable(s).

List literal example:

for 1..4 {
    .say;
}

Array examples:

for @arr {
    .say;
}

The for loop in its statement modifier form:

.say for @arr;

for @arr -> $x {
    say $x;
} 

for @arr -> $x, $y {    # more than one item at a time
    say "$x, $y";
} 

Hash example:

for keys %hash -> $key {
    say "$key: $hash{$key}";
}

or

for %hash.kv -> $key, $value {
    say "$key: $value";
}

or

for %hash -> $x {
    say "$x.key(): $x.value()";    # Parentheses needed to inline in double quoted string
}

Direct modification of collection members with a doubly pointy block, <->: 

my @arr = 1,2,3;
for @arr <-> $x {
    $x *= 2;
}
# Now @arr = 2,4,6;

Ruby 

set.each do |item|
  # do something to item
end

or

for item in set
  # do something to item
end

This can also be used with a hash.

set.each do |item,value|
  # do something to item
  # do something to value
end

Rust 

The for loop has the structure for <pattern> in <expression> { /* optional statements */ }. It implicitly calls the IntoIterator::into_iter method on the expression, and uses the resulting value, which must implement the Iterator trait. If the expression is itself an iterator, it is used directly by the for loop through an implementation of IntoIterator for all Iterators that returns the iterator unchanged. The loop calls the Iterator::next method on the iterator before executing the loop body. If Iterator::next returns Some(_), the value inside is assigned to the pattern and the loop body is executed; if it returns None, the loop is terminated.

let mut numbers = vec![1, 2, 3];

// Immutable reference:
for number in &numbers { // calls IntoIterator::into_iter(&numbers)
    println!("{}", number);
}

for square in numbers.iter().map(|x| x * x) { // numbers.iter().map(|x| x * x) implements Iterator
    println!("{}", square);
}

// Mutable reference:
for number in &mut numbers { // calls IntoIterator::into_iter(&mut numbers)
    *number *= 2;
}

// prints "[2, 4, 6]":
println!("{:?}", numbers);

// Consumes the Vec and creates an Iterator:
for number in numbers { // calls IntoIterator::into_iter(numbers)
    // ...
}

// Errors with "borrow of moved value":
// println!("{:?}", numbers);

Scala 

// return list of modified elements
items map { x => doSomething(x) }
items map multiplyByTwo

for {x <- items} yield doSomething(x)
for {x <- items} yield multiplyByTwo(x)

// return nothing, just perform action
items foreach { x => doSomething(x) }
items foreach println

for {x <- items} doSomething(x)
for {x <- items} println(x)

// pattern matching example in for-comprehension
for ((key, value) <- someMap) println(s"$key -> $value")

Scheme 

(for-each do-something-with a-list)
do-something-with is a one-argument function.

Smalltalk 

collection do: [:item| "do something to item" ]

Swift 

Swift uses the for…in construct to iterate over members of a collection.

for thing in someCollection {
    // do something with thing
}

The for…in loop is often used with the closed and half-open range constructs to iterate over the loop body a certain number of times.

for i in 0..<10 {
    // 0..<10 constructs a half-open range, so the loop body
    // is repeated for i = 0, i = 1, …, i = 9.
}

for i in 0...10 {
    // 0...10 constructs a closed range, so the loop body
    // is repeated for i = 0, i = 1, …, i = 9, i = 10.
}

SystemVerilog 

SystemVerilog supports iteration over any vector or array type of any dimensionality using the foreach keyword.

A trivial example iterates over an array of integers:

A more complex example iterates over an associative array of arrays of integers:

Tcl 

Tcl uses foreach to iterate over lists. It is possible to specify more than one iterator variable, in which case they are assigned sequential values from the list. 

It is also possible to iterate over more than one list simultaneously. In the following i assumes sequential values of the first list, j sequential values of the second list:

Visual Basic .NET 

For Each item In enumerable
    ' Do something with item.
Next

or without type inference

For Each item As type In enumerable
    ' Do something with item.
Next

Windows

Conventional command processor 

Invoke a hypothetical frob command three times, giving it a color name each time.
C:\>FOR %%a IN ( red green blue ) DO frob %%a

Windows PowerShell 

foreach ($item in $set) {
    # Do something to $item
}

From a pipeline

$list | ForEach-Object {Write-Host $_}

# or using the aliases
$list | foreach {write $_}
$list | % {write $_}

XSLT 

 <xsl:for-each select="set">
   <!-- do something for the elements in <set> -->
 </xsl:for-each>

See also 
 Do while loop
 For loop
 While loop
 Map (higher-order function)

References 

Articles with example Ada code
Articles with example Perl code
Articles with example PHP code
Articles with example Python (programming language) code
Articles with example Racket code
Articles with example Smalltalk code
Articles with example Tcl code
Control flow
Programming language comparisons
Articles with example Java code
Articles with example Haskell code

ru:Цикл просмотра